Desulfohalobium is a Gram negative, anaerobic, sulfate-reducing, moderately halophilic and rod-shaped bacterial genus from the family of Desulfovibrionaceae.

See also
 List of bacterial orders
 List of bacteria genera

References

Further reading 
 
 
 

Bacteria genera
Halophiles
Desulfovibrionales